Alois Christian Knoll (born 19 March 1961 in Stuttgart) is German computer scientist and professor at the TUM Department of Informatics at the Technical University of Munich (TUM). He is head of the Chair of Robotics, Artificial Intelligence and Real-Time Systems and known for seminal contributions to Human–Robot-Interaction, Neurorobotics and Autonomous Systems.

Biography 
Alois Knoll received his diploma in electrical engineering/communications engineering from the University of Stuttgart in 1985. In 1988, he received his doctorate summa cum laude from the Technical University of Berlin. He was a member of the Department of Computer Science of the TU Berlin from 1985 to 1993 and received his habilitation in computer science in 1993. He was then appointed full professor at Bielefeld University, where he was the founding director of the Computer Engineering Group (Chair) until 2001. Between 2001 and 2004, he was a group leader and a member of the steering committee of the Fraunhofer Institute for Autonomous Intelligent Systems FhG-AIS. Since 2001, he has been a professor at the Department of Computer Science at the Technical University of Munich. In 2009, he was co-founder and from then on scientific director of the state research institute fortiss until 2018. Between 2007 and 2009 he was a member of ISTAG, the Information Society Technologies Advisory Group, the he EU's highest ICT advisory committee. He was also a member of the ISTAG's subcommittee on Future and Emerging Technologies, the working group that defined the European flagship projects and a co-author of that group's initial report. From 2011 to 2021, he was Program Principal Investigator at TUMCREATE in Singapore and head of the Area-Interlinking Design Analysis group. Between 2017 and 2021 he was a visiting professor at the School of Computer Science and Engineering (SCSE) at Nanyang Technological University NTU in Singapore. Since 2013, he has been leading the Neurorobotics subproject of the European ICT flagship project Human Brain Project HBP and has led the development of the Neurorobotics Platform of the HBP, which is part of EBRAINS, the digital research infrastructure, created by the HBP. From 2019 to 2020, he was also Chief Digital Officer at Siemens Mobility Intelligent Traffic Systems.

Research 
Knoll's substantial contributions to Human-Robot-Interaction include the development of concepts, theories and–for proving their engineering significance–real robot systems that allowed the fusion of human communication modalities, including natural language, speech, vision and finger pointing as well as gaze, in order to enable to robot to "cognize" and reason about the intention of the human. He also introduced user-studies to explore the effects of robot behavior on humans and on optimal human-robot cooperation patterns, but also to find out how insights from neuroscience can be used to make robots learn faster and how they can be designed to interact with humans in order to maximize efficient cooperation. This work paved the way for a great number of ensuing projects dedicated to advanced human-robot cooperation heavily based on large sensor sets, sensor data fusion and advanced cognitive skills.

Specialising in the field of cognitive robotics and AI integration, he was a proposer/co-proposer of the biggest and most advanced research projects in Europe, has published more than 900 peer-reviewed papers, educated thousands of students, and supervised 80 PhD students to date. He has served on the editorial boards of several journals in the field, and he is editor-in-chief of Frontiers in Neurorobotics. Together with George A. Bekey, in 1999, he initiated the IEEE conference series on humanoid robotics and was the program chair of the first conference Humanoids2000. With Toshio Fukuda and others, he helped create the IEEE conference series on Cyborgs and Bionic systems. He is also a Distinguished Lecturer in the IEEE Robotics and Automation Society and an IEEE Fellow.

Selected publications

References

External links 

 Alois C. Knoll at TUM
 Alois C. Knoll' research group at TUM
 Google Scholar Profile

1961 births
Living people
Scientists from Stuttgart
German computer scientists
Academic staff of the Technical University of Munich
University of Stuttgart alumni
Technical University of Berlin alumni
Bielefeld University alumni